The Marin Cabinet is the incumbent 76th government of Finland. It was formed following the collapse of the Rinne Cabinet and officially took office on 10 December 2019. The cabinet headed by Sanna Marin consists of a coalition formed by the Social Democratic Party, the Centre Party, the Green League, the Left Alliance, and the Swedish People's Party.

Ministers 

There are a total of 19 ministers in Marin's cabinet: seven ministers from the Social Democratic Party, five from the Centre Party, three from the Green League, and two each from the Left Alliance and Swedish People's Party.

The composition mostly resembles that of the preceding Rinne Cabinet, although the former prime minister, Antti Rinne, does not have a position in the new government. The leader of the Centre Party, Katri Kulmuni, exchanged her Rinne-era portfolio as the Minister of Economic Affairs for the combined position of the Minister of Finance and the Minister deputising for the Prime Minister, switching places with Mika Lintilä. The latter portfolio carries significant veto power over government finances, and its holder is effectively the government's second-in-command. This transfer solidified Kulmuni's position as the leader of the Centre Party – a position which she had assumed only three months before the formation of Marin's government. Sirpa Paatero, the Social Democratic minister previously responsible for local government and ownership steering, was readmitted into the government despite her resignation from the Rinne Cabinet just days before. Ownership steering responsibilities were given to Tytti Tuppurainen, the Minister of European Affairs. SDP's Tuula Haatainen, the only new minister in Marin's government, took over as the Minister of Employment from Timo Harakka, and Harakka was given Sanna Marin's former portfolio of the Minister of Transport and Communications. All other portfolios were unchanged. The portfolio assignments as of July 2021 were:

|}

Controversies

Gender balance
When the Marin Cabinet was formed, professor Anne Holli, a political scientist at the University of Helsinki, pointed out that the cabinet was deviating from the principle of gender equality, specifically the Finnish convention of each gender being represented by at least 40% of ministers: with 12 of the 19 ministers women, men accounted for only 37%. Prime Minister Marin responded to the criticism by explaining that with five parties in the coalition, and each party responsible for their own ministerial nominations, it was not always possible to coordinate things to the extent of ensuring gender balance.

Repatriation of Al-Hawl refugees
On 11 December 2019, all opposition parties filed a motion leading to a vote of no-confidence over repatriation of Finnish women and children from the Syrian Al-Hawl refugee camp. The motion followed criticism over the evasive statements on the issue by the government and the accusations that the Minister of Foreign Affairs Pekka Haavisto had supplied inaccurate information to the Parliament. Haavisto had rejected assertions that detailed plans existed to bring Finnish citizens home, while Finnish national broadcasting company Yle broke news about official documents stating otherwise. Haavisto was also accused of pushing through a plan to bring the children back to Finland without their mothers' consent by sidelining a top ministry official in the process.

On 14 December 2019, Iltalehti released results of a survey in which 53% of people deemed Haavisto's actions wrong, while 32% saw them correct and 16% were unsure.

On 18 December 2019, the parliament voted 110–79 in favor of Haavisto's confidence. On the following day, 10 MPs filed a notion to the Constitutional Law Committee to request an inspection into the actions of Haavisto. On 19 February 2020, the Constitutional Law Committee announced that it was requesting the Prosecutor General to start a preliminary investigation into Haavisto's actions.

Minister of Finance Katri Kulmuni was further criticized over an Instagram poll, in which she asked whether to evacuate "children only" or "children and mothers" from the camp. After the post was panned by the public and representatives of human rights organizations, Kulmuni deleted the poll and apologized.

Katri Kulmuni's resignation 
Katri Kulmuni was found to have misappropriated funds by buying training and consulting services for herself and billing two ministries for this. As a result, Kulmuni resigned and was replaced by Matti Vanhanen.

Politics

Citizens' initiatives 
The Marin Cabinet initiated a citizens' initiative for the implementation of an aviation tax in February 2020.

The Ministry of Finance studied the taxation of capital gains from Finland in emigration. In February 2020, the tax was implemented e.g. in Denmark, Norway and the Netherlands.

References

Cabinets of Finland
Cabinets established in 2019
2019 establishments in Finland
Current governments